123RF (Part of Inmagine Group) is a stock photos agency founded in 2005 which sells royalty-free images and stock photography. In the past few years, 123RF expanded the portfolio to serve the growing market of the web-based content industry. In addition to over 200 million images in its library, the company also has a large collection of vector graphics, icons, fonts, videos and audio files. The marketing is mainly carried out by about 350 employees from 40 offices around the world.

History 
In 2000, the founder, Andy Sitt, had just left his job at a British company that sold stock images in CDs while showing customers printed catalogs. Andy launched his e-commerce business by setting up Inmagine, selling premium large-format photo prints. Together with Stephanie Sitt as a co-founder and current CEO, Inmagine Group is one of the few technology companies to have bootstrapped globally from Asia.

From the beginning, Inmagine produced proprietary content, which required in-house photographers, graphic designers, professional models, makeup artists, and a sales team to cater to demand.

In 2005, Inmagine set up 123RF, which offers royalty-free stock images, videos, as well as audio clips, from just US$1 to US$3 apiece. Unlike the previous business model, 123RF allows photographers around the world to sell their work on the platform under a crowdsourcing model.

In 2011, Inmagine established a global presence with 44 regional offices worldwide, with offices in North and Latin America, Europe, Asia, Africa, the Middle East, and Australasia 

Subsequently, Inmagine Group has expanded by building new businesses such as Stockunlimited.com, Designs.net. In addition, the company also acquired TheHungryJPEG.com, Craftbundles.com, Pixlr.com, Vectr.com, and Storyandheart.com in 2017.

In 2019, Inmagine had also consolidated and streamlined its offerings into three main products; 123RF, Pixlr, and Designs.ai, along with launching Pixlr Market (now Stock by Pixlr) and Pixlr Editor.

That following year in 2020, the company launched its first artificial intelligence platform, Inmagine Brain. In November 2020, the company confirmed that it had been subject to a data breach, with 8.3 million customer records from the breach available for sale on the dark web.

Through 123RF, Inmagine created a visual guide in 2021 to predict image search trends and colors that will be used throughout the year.

In June 2022, the company launched its free images section, where audiences can download images for free, but with only a limited amount of daily downloads

Acquisitions 
In March 2017, 123RF acquired TheHungryJPEG, a UK-registered font and graphics marketplace and its sister company Craftbundles for an undisclosed sum.

In April 2017, 123RF acquired Pixlr, an online web-based image editor from Autodesk for an undisclosed sum.

In November 2017, 123RF acquired Vectr, a web-based vector editor and Story & Heart, a video education platform.

References

External links
Pixlr

2005 establishments in Malaysia
Stock photography
Photography companies of Malaysia
Data breaches